Charles Wilson Pierce (October 7, 1823 – February 18, 1907) was a U.S. Representative from Alabama.

Biography
Born in Benton, New York, Pierce completed preparatory studies.
He moved with his father to Sandusky, Ohio, in 1829, and from there to Huntsville, Ohio, in 1847.
He moved to Havana, Illinois, in 1855.
During the Civil War enlisted in Company B, Eighty-fifth Regiment, Illinois Volunteer Infantry, and was elected first lieutenant.
He was appointed quartermaster June 14, 1864.
Commissioned major in 1865.
He settled in Demopolis, Alabama.
Held various public offices.
Upon the readmission of Alabama to representation was elected as a Republican to the Fortieth Congress and served from July 21, 1868, to March 3, 1869.
He declined to be a candidate for renomination.
He moved to Nebraska in 1872.
He served as member of the Nebraska State constitutional convention in 1875.

Pierce was elected to the State senate in 1877 and reelected in 1880.
He resigned in 1881 to become register of the United States land office, which position he held until May 1886.
He returned to his farm.
He died in Hastings, Florida, February 18, 1907.
He was interred in the family plot on the home farm near Waverly, Nebraska.

References

External links

1823 births
1907 deaths
Union Army officers
Republican Party members of the United States House of Representatives from Alabama
People from Benton, New York
19th-century American politicians
People from Havana, Illinois
People from Sandusky, Ohio
People from Logan County, Ohio
People from Lancaster County, Nebraska
Military personnel from Illinois